The Hollywood Pop Up Comedy Club is a Los Angeles and Beirut based brand which brings U.S. comedians to cities where they do not have comedy clubs yet. It was launched by co-founders Ron Senkowski and Samira Kawas in April 2018.

History 
The first stand-up comedy event was held in Beirut at the St. Georges Yacht Club. After a year of shows in Beirut, the company expanded to Saudi Arabia by bringing six U.S.-based comedians to perform during the first ever Jeddah Season in June 2019. After this, the company has produced Maz Jobrani's Middle Eastern Peaceful Warrior tour and events in Bahrain, Dubai, Oman, Jordan, Kuwait, Doha, Riyadh, and Jeddah. At the 2019 inaugural edition of Riyadh Season, the team brought Eddie Griffin to perform for two nights in the Boulevard zone.

Events (2018–present)

References

External links 

 Official website Hollywood Pop Up Entertainment
 Official website Symply Entertainment
 The Hollywood Comedy Pop Up Club on IMDb

Comedy venues
Comedy clubs in the United States